The 1931–32 season was the 35th in the history of the Western Football League.

The Division One champions for the second time in their history were Plymouth Argyle Reserves, although they left the league at the end of the season. The winners of Division Two were Portland United for the second season running. There was again no promotion or relegation between the two divisions this season.

Division One
Division One was increased from seven to eight clubs, with one new club joining:

Lovells Athletic, rejoining after leaving the league in 1928.

Division Two
Division Two was increased from seventeen to eighteen clubs after Petters Westland left after just one season, and two new clubs joined:

Frome Town, rejoining after leaving the league in 1927.
Glastonbury, rejoining after leaving the league in 1922.

References

1931-32
4